Sarah Reid (born June 2, 1987) is a Canadian skeleton racer who has competed since 2005. In 2013 Sarah had 3 podium finishes including win in Lake Placid and a silver on home soil in the Whistler World Cup Event. She finished 5th overall in the world cup season. Sarah is now competing in the 2014 Winter Olympics in Sochi for Canada.

External links
 
 
 
 

1987 births
Canadian female skeleton racers
Living people
Olympic skeleton racers of Canada
Skeleton racers at the 2014 Winter Olympics
Sportspeople from Calgary
20th-century Canadian women
21st-century Canadian women